Bulbul tarang, Gurmukhi, (ਬੁਲਬੁਲਤ੍ਰਂਗ literally "waves of nightingales", alternately Indian or Punjabi banjo) is a string instrument from Punjab (ਪਂਜਾਬ) which evolved from the Japanese taishōgoto, which likely arrived in South Asia in the 1930s.

The instrument employs two sets of strings, one set for drone, and one for melody.  The strings run over a plate or fretboard, while above are keys resembling typewriter keys, which when depressed fret or shorten the strings to raise their pitch.

Tuning
The melody strings are commonly tuned to the same note, or in octaves, while the drone strings are tuned to the 1st and 5th of the melody strings.  Tuned in this manner, the instrument is uni-tonic, or not used to modulate to different keys because the fine melismatic music of India is more concerned with expressing subtle, microtonal pitch increments in a music-theoretic system radically different from Western, predominantly harmonic music; so that modulation to different keys is not considered so important.  The melody strings may be tuned to different pitches if desired, however, rendering it multi-tonic, but more difficult to play.  The bulbul tarang is most commonly played as accompaniment to singing. Similar to the Autoharp, a chord can be selected when a key is depressed, and the strings are often bowed or strummed with a pick.

Related instruments
The Indian version is sometimes known as the "Indian banjo" or "Japan banjo", due to its descent from the taishokoto; similar instruments in Germany and Austria are known as akkordolia, and in Pakistan as benju. In the Maldives it is known as a kottafoshi, and as medolin (pronounced "mendolin" after the mandolin) in the Fijian Indian diaspora.

A more complicated and electrified version is known as the shahi baaja.

Notable players
 Hala Strana
 Harry Fuller 
 Air, a jazz group
 Ahuva Ozeri From Tel-Aviv, Israel

References

Typewriter zithers
Indian musical instruments
Pakistani musical instruments
Maldivian musical instruments
Fijian musical instruments
Articles containing video clips